Huayllamarca is a small town in Bolivia, capital of the Province of Nor Carangas in the northern region of the Department of Oruro. The city appears in a music video for Los Kjarkas.

References

Populated places in Oruro Department